Happy Valley Chengdu is a theme park in Jinniu District, Chengdu, Sichuan Province, China. Opened on 17 January 2009, it is the third installation of the Happy Valley theme park chain.

Notable rides

Transportation
Happy Valley Chengdu is adjacent to the Xihua Avenue station on Line 6 of Chengdu Metro.

References 

Buildings and structures in Chengdu
Tourist attractions in Chengdu
2009 establishments in China
Amusement parks opened in 2009
Chengdu